Fritz Güntzler (born 6 May 1966) is a German auditor and politician of the Christian Democratic Union (CDU) who has been serving as a member of the Bundestag from the state of Lower Saxony since 2013.

Political career 
Güntzler served as a member of the Landtag of Lower Saxony from 2005 until 2008 and from 2010 until 2013. 

Güntzler first became a member of the Bundestag in the 2013 German federal election, representing Göttingen. In parliament, he is a member of the Finance Committee and the Sports Committee. He serves as his parliamentary group’s rapporteur on the property tax.

Other activities

Corporate boards 
 DATEV, Member of the Advisory Board
 Moore Global Germany, Member of the Supervisory Board

Non-profit organizations 
 Göttingen International Handel Festival, Member of the Supervisory Board
 Max Planck Institute for Biophysical Chemistry, Member of the Board of Trustees
 Max Planck Institute for Dynamics and Self-Organization, Member of the Board of Trustees
 Max Planck Institute for Solar System Research, Member of the Board of Trustees

Political positions 
In June 2017, Güntzler voted against his parliamentary group’s majority and in favor of Germany’s introduction of same-sex marriage.

References

External links 

  
 Bundestag biography 

1966 births
Living people
Members of the Bundestag for Lower Saxony
Members of the Bundestag 2021–2025
Members of the Bundestag 2017–2021
Members of the Bundestag 2013–2017
Members of the Bundestag for the Christian Democratic Union of Germany